Live Live Live Tokyo Dome 1993-1996 is a live album released by X Japan on October 15, 1997. As the title implies, it contains songs recorded at the Tokyo Dome between 1993 and 1996, all of them at the band's annual New Year's Eve concerts at that stadium. The album reached number 3 on the Oricon chart. A supplemental disc, titled Live Live Live Extra was released the following month.

Track listing 
Disc one
 "Prologue" (1993.12.31)
 "Blue Blood" (1993.12.31)
 "Sadistic Desire" (1993.12.31)
 "Week End" (1995.12.31)
 "Rose of Pain"  Acoustic (1994.12.31)
 "Tears"  Acoustic (1995.12.30)
 "Standing Sex" (1993.12.31)
 "Count Down ~ X" (1993.12.31)
 "Endless Rain" (1993.12.31)

Disc two
 "Amethyst" (1996.12.31)
 "Rusty Nail" (1996.12.31)
 "Dahlia" (1996.12.31)
 "Crucify My Love" (1996.12.31)
 "Scars" (1996.12.31)
 "White Poem I " (199612.31)
 "Drain" (1996.12.31)
 "Say Anything"  Acoustic (1995.12.31)
 "Tears" (1993.12.31)
 "Forever Love" (1996.12.31)

References 

X Japan live albums
Albums recorded at the Tokyo Dome
1997 live albums